Sun Blood Stories is an American experimental band from Boise, Idaho, founded in 2011. Named after the color of Boise's skies during summer forest fires, their mesmerizing live sound has been likened to modern-day opera.

The group performs regularly at the annual Treefort Music Fest, Boise's signature event.

Previously signed to Banana Stand Media, the band now releases material independently.

Discography
 Albums

The Electric Years (2007)
Early Recording of Early Songs of Sun Blood Stories (2011)
Live From the Banana Stand (2015)
Samhain Variation: In Flight Air Raid Wake Up I Don't Know (2015)
Twilight Midnight Morning (2015)
It Runs Around the Room with Us (2017)
 Haunt Yourself (2019)

References

External links 

American psychedelic rock music groups
Rock music groups from Idaho
Musicians from Boise, Idaho
Musical groups established in 2011
2011 establishments in Idaho